This was the sixteenth European Championship and was won for the seventh time by England after a gap of thirteen years.

Results

Final standings

England win the tournament on points difference.

References

European Nations Cup
European rugby league championship
European rugby league championship
International rugby league competitions hosted by the United Kingdom
International rugby league competitions hosted by France
1969 in English rugby league
1970 in English rugby league
1969 in Welsh sport
1970 in Welsh sport
1970 in French sport
1969 in French sport